Actinocenes are a family of organoactinide compounds consisting of metallocenes containing elements from the actinide series. They typically have a sandwich structure with two dianionic cyclooctatetraenyl ligands (COT2-, which is ) bound to an actinide-metal center (An) in the oxidation state IV, resulting in the general formula An(C8H8)2.

Characterised actinocenes 

The most studied actinocene is uranocene, U(C8H8)2, which in 1968 was the first member of this family to be synthesised and is still viewed as the archetypal example. Other actinocenes that have been synthesised are protactinocene (Pa(C8H8)2), thorocene (Th(C8H8)2), neptunocene (Np(C8H8)2), and plutonocene (Pu(C8H8)2). Especially the latter two, neptunocene and plutonocene, have not been extensively studied experimentally since the 1980s because of the radiation hazard they pose.

Bonding 
The actinide-cyclooctatetraenyl bonding has been of interest for multiple theoretical studies. Computational chemistry methods indicate bonding with a large covalent character resulting mainly from the mixing of actinide 6d orbitals with ligand π-orbitals, with a smaller interaction involving the actinide 5f and ligand π-orbitals. The covalent component is characterised by donation of electron density to the actinide.

Analogous sandwiched M(C8H8)2 compounds also exist for lanthanides M = Nd, Tb, and Yb, but therein the bonding is mostly ionic rather than covalent (see lanthanocenes).

See also
Organoactinide chemistry
f-block metallocene

References

Organoactinide compounds
Metallocenes